is a visual novel developed by Chunsoft for the PlayStation 3. It is the first visual novel to be released on a seventh generation console. It was later released for the Nintendo Wii under the title Imabikisō: Kaimei-hen with additional content. The game imagery consists mostly of static or animated photographs, though live-action clips are scattered throughout.

Plot

A new and mysterious drug known as "Vision" has been hitting the streets of Japan, being a hit to the young people, especially to those studying in university. The drug, if and when taken, allows the users to see visions from a user's perspective while being high, created from a mysterious flower called Imabikisō. Players play a university student named Hiroki Makimura, who gets together with fellow student Manami Hayase and a few other students when they heard news reports of students being mysteriously killed with horrific burns on their bodies.

The two later investigate a mansion that's believed to be linked to the drug's creation and to Imabikisō after some of their classmates in university begin to die after taking Vision.

PSN contents
A playable demo featuring three stories and the official trailer was released on the Japanese PlayStation Store on October 15, 2007.

Additional contents were also made available on the PlayStation Store, these were two extra free of charge chapters.

Remote Play

Both the demo and the actual game are playable on the PlayStation Portable handheld console through Remote Play.

References

External links
 Official page

2007 video games
Chunsoft games
2000s horror video games
Japan-exclusive video games
PlayStation 3 games
Sega video games
Visual novels
Wii games
Video games developed in Japan